Đuričić (also transliterated Djuričić) is a Serbian family name.

Geography
 Đuričić, Croatia, an uninhabited settlement in Croatia

Notable people
 Aleksandar Đuričić (born 1982), Serbian writer
 Anđelko Đuričić (born 1980), Serbian football goalkeeper
 Bogdan Đuričić (1950–2008), Serbian scientist
 Dragoljub Đuričić (born 1953),  Montenegrin musician
 Dušan Đuričić (born 1990), Serbian football midfielder
 Filip Đuričić (born 1992), Serbian football player
 Jasna Đuričić (born 1966), Serbian actress
 Saša Đuričić (born 1979), Bosnian Croat football defender

Serbian surnames
Slavic-language surnames
Patronymic surnames